Amour, sexe et mobylette (Love, sex, and moped) is a 2008 French documentary film about romance in Burkina Faso.

References

External links

2008 films
French documentary films
German documentary films
2008 documentary films
Burkinabé documentary films
2000s French films
2000s German films